A tug of war competition was held August 31 and September 1 at Francis Field in St. Louis, Missouri, as part of the 1904 Summer Olympics. Thirty athletes participated from six teams across three countries, and six games were played. Four American teams took the top four places, followed by Greek and South African teams unplaced.

Background
Tug of war was first held during the 1900 Olympics, when it was won by a mixed team from Scandinavia, featuring three Danish and three Swedish athletes. For the 1904 games in St. Louis, six teams entered. Four of the teams were representing the host nation, the United States, while there were also teams from Greece and South Africa. For the United States, the Milwaukee Athletic Club entered a team, the Southwest Turnverein of St. Louis entered two teams, and the New York Athletic Club were the final entrant. A team from the Pan-Hellenic Athletic Club represented Greece, while South Africa was represented by the Boer Team. The contests were held on turf ground with no shoes on, over a period of five minutes. If within that five minutes, a team succeeded in pulling the other team across a line  from their starting position, they were deemed to win. Otherwise, the team that had pulled their opponents closest to the line after five minutes would be the winner. Three local judges were selected to officiate in the competition; Clark Hetherington of the University of Missouri, and John Meyers and Myles McDonough, both of St. Louis.

Results

August 30 was the first day of the tug of war competition.  The two quarterfinal matches and the first semifinal match (between the two teams who had had byes in the quarterfinals) were held.  The rest of the competition was conducted on 1 September.

Quarterfinals

Losers were eliminated.

Semifinals

The losers were sent to the repechage, to play each other for the chance to play the loser of the final for second place.

Final

The winner received the gold medal, while the loser had to play the winner of the repechage in the silver medal match.

Silver medal semifinal

The winner of this match played the loser of the final for the silver medal.

Silver medal match

The New York team did not appear for the silver medal match, resulting in the silver medal being awarded to the Saint Louis No. 1 team.

Bronze medal match

The New York team also did not appear for the bronze medal match, resulting in the bronze medal being awarded to Saint Louis No. 2.

Final standings

Participating nations
6 teams of 5, for a total of 30 athletes, competed. The host team had four teams, and two other nations each sent one.

Rosters

 Milwaukee Athletic Club
Patrick Flanagan  Sidney Johnson  Oscar Olson  Conrad Magnusson  Henry Seiling

 Southwest Turnverein of St. Louis No. 1
Max Braun  August Rodenberg  Charles Rose  William Seiling  Orrin Upshaw

 Southwest Turnverein of St. Louis No. 2
Oscar Friede  Charles Haberkorn  Harry Jacobs  Frank Kugler (GER)  Charles Thias

 New York Athletic Club
Charles Chadwick  Charles Dieges  Lawrence Feuerbach  Sam Jones  Jim Mitchel

 Boer Team
Pieter Hillense  Pieter Lombard  Johannes Schutte  Paulus Visser  Christopher Walker

 Pan-Hellenic Athletic Club
Dimitrios Dimitrakopoulos  Nikolaos Georgantas  Anastasios Georgopoulos  Periklis Kakousis  Vasilios Metalos

Medal table

References

Sources

External links
 

 
1904 Summer Olympics events
1904s
1904 in tug of war